Agcaoili is a Ilocano surname. Notable people with the surname include:

 Asia Agcaoili (born 1977), Filipino actress, model, and TV and radio host
 Phil Agcaoili (born 1977), Filipino-American technologist, entrepreneur, and cyber security leader

Ilocano-language surnames